Yu Miu-Lin (born 4 July 1937) is a Chinese actress from Hong Kong. Yu is credited with 145 films.

Early life 
In 4 July 1937, Yu was born as Yu Chi-nga in Canton. Her late mother Tang Mei-mei (鄧美美) was an actress who was not widely known, and her younger sister Yu Chi-lai (stage name Koi Chi-fui) was a pupil of Cantonese Opera performer Yam Kim-fai.

Career 
Yu began her career as a saleswoman in a department store. She took part in the repertory theatre, and once featured in The Taming of the Shrew.

In 1950, Yu became an actress in Hong Kong films. Yu appeared in The Elderly Gentleman Searches for Romance, a 1950 Comedy film directed by Wong Hok-Sing. Yu's recent film is All's Well Ends Well 2020, a 2020 Comedy film directed by Raymond Wong Pak-Ming. Yu is credited with over 145 films.

From 1979, she began to appear in TVB series. She was often assigned roles such as a street cleaner, maid and unattractive women. Yu adopted her stage name Mo-lin after the government official yacht Lady Maurine which was in turn named after the wife of governor Sir Alexander Grantham. She is a character actress who has a talent in comical roles. Her roles and personality leave a deep impression with the audience and she does not mind to be the symbol of 'ugly woman' on TV and movies in Hong Kong.

Filmography

Films 
This is a partial list of films.

Television

Philanthropy 
In 2004, Yu donated 80,000 yuan for building an elementary school in Guizhou Province, China and the school is entitled Yu Mu Lian Hope School.
On 22 June 2006, she acted as the ambassador of the charitable activity called 'Cascc famine eight hours'.

Latest condition 
In 2020, Yu was diagnosed with a rare type of blood cancer and pulmonary fibrosis

References

External links
 
 Yu Miu-lin at senscritique.com
 

Living people
Hong Kong film actresses
TVB veteran actors
Hong Kong Christians
Hong Kong television actresses
Actresses from Guangdong
Actresses from Guangzhou
1940 births
Chinese film actresses
Chinese television actresses
20th-century Chinese actresses
21st-century Chinese actresses
20th-century Hong Kong actresses
21st-century Hong Kong actresses